Bicellariella is a genus of bryozoans belonging to the family Bugulidae.

The genus has cosmopolitan distribution.

Species:

Bicellaria setifera 
Bicellariella bonsai 
Bicellariella brevispina 
Bicellariella chuakensis 
Bicellariella ciliata 
Bicellariella cookae 
Bicellariella edentata 
Bicellariella fragilis 
Bicellariella levinseni 
Bicellariella sinica 
Bicellariella stolonifera 
Bicellariella turbinata

References

External links

Bryozoan genera